The 737th Expeditionary Airlift Squadron is a provisional United States Air Force unit assigned to Air Combat Command (ACC) to activate or inactivate as needed. It operates Lockheed C-130 Hercules aircraft in theater airlift missions as part of the Global War on Terrorism. Its current status and duty location is undetermined.

The squadron was first activated as the 737th Bombardment Squadron in June 1943. After training in the United States with the Consolidated B-24 Liberator, it deployed to the Mediterranean Theater of Operations, participating in the strategic bombing campaign against Germany. It earned two Distinguished Unit Citations for its combat operations. Following V-E Day, it returned to the United States for conversion as a very heavy bomber unit, but was inactivated instead.

The squadron was activated in the reserves in 1947, but was not fully manned or equipped before inactivating in 1949. In 1952 it was redesignated the 737th Troop Carrier Squadron and again activated in the reserve, but was inactivated the following year and its personnel and equipment transferred to another unit. It was converted to provisional status in 2002 and assigned to Air Mobility Command. It was reassigned to ACC in 2003.

History

World War II
The squadron was first activated at Alamogordo Army Air Field, New Mexico in mid-1943 as the 737th Bombardment Squadron, one of the four Consolidated B-24 Liberator heavy bombardment squadrons assigned to the 454th Bombardment Group. The unit trained under Second Air Force. After training in the United States, the squadron deployed to the Mediterranean Theater of Operations in late 1943 and was stationed at San Giovanni Airfield under Fifteenth Air Force.

The unit engaged in very long range strategic bombardment of enemy military, industrial and transportation targets. It initially flew some interdiction and ground support missions, participating in the drive to Rome. Most operations included attacks against such objectives as marshalling yards, aircraft factories, railroad bridges, and airdromes in Italy, Austria, and Romania. The squadron was awarded a Distinguished Unit Citation for an attack on an airfield at Bad Vöslau, Austria on 12 April 1944. It helped to prepare the way for and supported Operation Dragoon, the invasion of southern France, during July and August 1944. At the same time, expanded previous operations to include attacks on oil refineries and storage facilities, locomotive works, and viaducts in France, Germany, Czechoslovakia, Hungary, Austria, and in the Balkans. It earned a second Distinguished Unit Citation on 25 July when the 454th Group led the 304th Bombardment Wing through severe opposition in an attack on steel factories at Linz, Austria.

The squadron returned to the United States after VE Day  in May 1945. It began to reorganize as a Boeing B-29 Superfortress very heavy bombardment squadron. It began training under Second Air Force in August 1945, but was inactivated in October after VJ Day.

Air Force reserve
The squadron was activated as a reserve unit under Air Defense Command (ADC) at McChord Field, Washington in July 1947, where its training was supervised by the 406th AAF Base Unit (later the 2345th Air Force Reserve Training Center). It was nominally a heavy bomber unit, but it is not clear whether it was fully manned or had any combat aircraft assigned.  
In 1948 Continental Air Command (ConAC) assumed responsibility for managing reserve and Air National Guard units from ADC. The 737th was inactivated when ConAC reorganized its reserve units under the wing base organization system in June 1949. The squadron's personnel and equipment were transferred to elements of the 302d Troop Carrier Wing, which was simultaneously activated at McChord. This reorganization was also impacted by President Truman's reduced 1949 defense budget, which required reductions in the number of units in the Air Force.

The reserve mobilization for the Korean War had left the reserve without aircraft, and the reserves did not receive aircraft again until July 1952. In preparing for the receipt of aircraft, in June 1952, ConAC activated the 454th Troop Carrier Wing at Portland International Airport, Oregon to replace the 922d Reserve Training Wing, the non-flying headquarters for reserve units there.  The 737th was redesignated the 737th Troop Carrier Squadron and activated with the 454th Wing. It began training with Curtiss C-46 Commando transports. It was inactivated on 1 January 1953 with its personnel and equipment being reassigned to the 64th Troop Carrier Squadron when the 403d Troop Carrier Wing was released from active duty and replaced the 454th Wing as Portland's air reserve unit.

Expeditionary airlift
The squadron was converted to provisional status and redesignated 737th Expeditionary Airlift Squadron. It was activated as a Lockheed C-130 Hercules airlift squadron as part of the Global War on Terrorism and it made up of multiple detachments from airlift squadrons which constantly rotate.

Lineage
 Constituted as the 737th Bombardment Squadron (Heavy) on 14 May 1943
 Activated on 1 June 1943
 Redesignated 737th Bombardment Squadron, Heavy c. 1944
 Redesignated 737th Bombardment Squadron, Very Heavy on 5 August 1945
 Inactivated on 17 October 1945
 Activated in the reserve on 12 July 1947
 Inactivated on 27 June 1949
 Redesignated 737th Troop Carrier Squadron, Medium on 26 May 1952
 Activated in the reserve on 13 June 1952
 Inactivated on 1 January 1953
 Redesignated: 737th Expeditionary Airlift Squadron and converted to provisional status on 12 June 2002

Assignments
 454th Bombardment Group, 1 June 1943 - 17 October 1945
 454th Bombardment Group, 12 July 1947 - 27 June 1949
 454th Troop Carrier Group, 13 June 1952 - 1 January 1953
 Air Mobility Command to activate or inactivate as needed, 12 June 2002
 Air Combat Command to activate or inactivate as needed, 19 March 2003
 386th Expeditionary Operations Group

Stations
 Alamogordo Army Air Field, New Mexico, 1 June 1943
 Davis-Monthan Field, Arizona, 1 July 1943
 McCook Army Air Field, Nebraska, 31 July 1943
 Charleston Army Air Field, South Carolina, 3 October–December 1943
 Torretto Airfield, Italy 16 January 1944
 San Giovanni Airfield, Italy 24 January 1944 – July 1945
 Sioux Falls Army Air Field, South Dakota, 1 August 1945
 Pyote Army Air Field, Texas, 17 August – 17 October 1945
 McChord Field (later McChord Air Force Base), Washington, 12 July 1947 – 27 June 1949
 Portland International Airport, Oregon, 13 June 1952 – 1 January 1953
 Ali Al Salem Air Base, Kuwait, unknown

Aircraft
 Consolidated B-24 Liberator, 1943-1945
 Curtiss C-46 Commando, 1952-1953
 Lockheed C-130 Hercules,

Awards and campaigns

See also
 List of C-130 Hercules operators
 B-24 Liberator units of the United States Army Air Forces

References

Notes
 Explanatory notes

 Citations

Bibliography

 
 
 
 
 
 

Airlift squadrons of the United States Air Force
Air expeditionary squadrons of the United States Air Force